The First State Bank of Le Roy at Main St. and Broadway in Le Roy, Minnesota, United States, is a small bank that was built in 1914.  It was designed by architects Purcell & Elmslie in Prairie School architecture style.  It was listed on the National Register of Historic Places (NRHP) in 1986.

Its NRHP nomination describes it as "a small gem".  It was the third small bank designed by Purcell and Elmslie, and was designed to cost just under $10,000 to meet objections of a dissenting bank director.

See also
Exchange State Bank, the first small bank designed by Purcell and Elmslie, located in Grand Meadow, Minnesota, also NRHP-listed.

References

Bank buildings on the National Register of Historic Places in Minnesota
Buildings and structures in Mower County, Minnesota
Commercial buildings completed in 1914
Prairie School architecture in Minnesota
Purcell and Elmslie buildings
National Register of Historic Places in Mower County, Minnesota